Koidu Girls Secondary School is a government-sponsored secondary school for girls located in Koidutown, Kono District, Sierra Leone. Koidu Girls Secondary School was founded in 1952 to educate the girls in Koidu Town. It is the most prominent girls secondary school in the Kono District and one of the most prominent in Sierra Leone.

Notable alumni
 Khady Black, Rastafarian and Roots reggae musician
 Saara Kuugongelwa, prime minister of Namibia

External links
https://web.archive.org/web/20090914131832/http://www.deskgbongborkono.com/rich_text.html

Secondary schools in Sierra Leone
1952 establishments in Sierra Leone
Educational institutions established in 1952
Girls' schools in Sierra Leone
Koidu